B. R. Latha, popularly known as Bangalore Latha, was an Indian singer who worked in south Indian film industry, mainly in Kannada and Telugu.

Career
Latha entered films through the 1962 Kannada language film Mahathma Kabir,  starring Dr. Rajkumar and Krishna Kumari in lead role. She went on to record songs in Kannada, Telugu, Tamil, Malayalam and Tulu.

Latha recorded her duets with P. B. Srinivas, S. P. Balasubrahmanyam, M. Balamurali Krishna, Dr. Rajkumar, S. Janaki, Vani Jairam, P. Susheela, L. R. Eswari B. K. Sumitra, B. R. Chaya and some rare duets with Musuri Krishnamurthy, Shankar Nag and Vishnuvardhan.

Personal life
Latha was born in Bangalore. She married actor Tomato Somu. Latha committed suicide in the late 1990s.

Notable songs

Kannada Songs:
 Amba jagadamba (Oorigitta Kolli)
 Odi baa ododi baa (Chakra Theertha)
 Vanamali Vaikunthapathe (Parvathi Kalyana)
 Nee modalu modalu nanna nodidaga (Choori Chikkanna)
 Cheluvaralli Cheluva (Gange Gowri)
 Chandramukhi Pranasakhi (Naandi)
 Neenarigadeyo Ele Manava (Chandavalliya Thota)
 Hrudaya pallavi (Hrudaya  Pallavi) 
 Eko Eno e nanna manavu (Jwaalamukhi)
 Heluvudu ondu maduvudu innondu (Jwalamukhi)
 Aa moda banalli (Druva Thaare)
 Nada charite nenapisuva (Thayiya Hone)
 Aa rathiye Dharegilidante (Dhruva Thaare)
 Anuragada ravi udayisalu (Idu Namma Desha)
Telugu Songs: 
Latha has rendered some of her best songs in Telugu. The most famous was Salalitha Raga Sudharasa Saara with M. Balamuralikrishna, composed by Susarla Dakshinamurthi, from the 1963 classic Nartanasala.

 Amma annadi oka kommani (Bullemma Bullodu) 
 Sheelavathi (Narthanashala)
 Redu Messeeya (Yesu Paadamulandu) and more.

Film songs

Selected songs of Latha, are listed here.

Film songs

Non-film songs

Devotional / Folk songs

References

External links
 
Bangalore Latha songs on Gaana
Bangalore Latha songs on Wynk

20th-century women musicians
20th-century Indian singers
Kannada playback singers
People from Bangalore
Telugu playback singers
21st-century Indian singers
Indian women playback singers
Singers from Karnataka
Tamil playback singers
Singers from Bangalore
20th-century Indian women
Malayalam playback singers